Cristian Arrieta (born September 18, 1979, in Orlando, Florida) is a retired footballer and active coach.

Born in the United States and of Spanish and Italian heritage, Arrieta initially began playing soccer in Italy with various clubs in the lower divisions. In 2008, he returned to North America to sign with the Puerto Rico Islanders of the USL First Division. Under the guidance of Colin Clarke, Arrieta rose to prominence as one of the league's most consistent defenders. He was a pivotal factor in bringing the Islanders to a higher level of prestige among the league. He assisted the club by claiming their first regular-season championship, as well as reaching the playoff finals.

His performances in the CONCACAF Champions League provided Puerto Rico with stunning results over regional powerhouses, and helped the club reach the semi-finals of the tournament. In February 2010 he was ranked 14th in the USL First Division Top 25 of the Decade, which announced a list of the best and most influential players of the previous decade. That same year he gained his first cap for the Puerto Rico national team, and gained a total of 22 up to his retirement as a player in 2015.

Club career

Europe
Born in Florida to a Basque-Spanish father and an Italian mother from Salento, Arrieta grew up in Bilbao, Spain and Borgomanero in Italy. He spent much of his early career playing in the Italian lower divisions, and has over 120 appearances for clubs such as Varese, Mestre, Ivrea and Alessandria in Serie C2, also taking part to the Italian reality show Campioni, il sogno (Champions, the dream), centered around the football club Cervia.

In 2005, he signed with Lecco in Serie C1, and then for Lecce in Serie B in 2006, the highest level of soccer he attained in his homeland. Then he made 7 appearances for Lecce.

North America
Arrieta went abroad to Puerto Rico in 2008, and signed with the Puerto Rico Islanders in the USL First Division. Arrieta would prove to become a valuable asset to the club, by guiding the Islanders to a string of success. One notable match he appeared in was against the Rochester Rhinos, where the game concluded to a score of 4–0 in favour of the Islanders. It was a memorable match due to the fact it placed the club at the top of the standings for the first time in club history. Arrieta managed to assist the club in remaining at the top of the standings and on September 19, won the club's first Commissioners Cup which clinched first place in the league's regular season standings. He contributed by establishing a solid backline that would post the best defensive performance in the league. Arrieta also managed an astonishing offensive record for a defender with seven goals and two assists, ranking him ninth in goals. On October 11, 2008, he received the Defender of the Year award and as well was selected into the USL First Division All-League First Team. In the club's playoff run, he led the Islanders to the USL 1 Division final only to be defeated by the Vancouver Whitecaps by a score of 2–1. He also led the Islanders to the knockout stages of the CONCACAF Champions League.

During the 2009 season, Arrieta enjoyed another career high season. He concluded the season with 10 goals and five assists, which placed him in fourth in goals.
He helped lead the club back to the playoffs with a third-place finish, and for the second consecutive year he earned an All-League selection. On October 15, 2009, Arrieta was once again awarded the Defender of the Year award, becoming the third player in USL history to win the award twice in a row. On the same night he earned the Most Valuable Player award, thus becoming only the second defender to earn the honor, with Marcelo Balboa being the first in 1988.

Arrieta signed with Major League Soccer club Philadelphia Union on April 5, 2010. He was waived by Philadelphia on February 8, 2011. He signed with Fort Lauderdale Strikers of the North American Soccer League on March 31, 2011. Arrieta was let go by the club at the end of the season.

International career
Arrieta was called up to the Puerto Rico national team in September 2010. As a United States citizen he is eligible to the team after residing in the Commonwealth for two years while playing with the Puerto Rico Islanders. He got his first cap in a 2010 Caribbean Championship qualification stage match against Anguilla on October 2, 2010, and scored his first goal in the same competition against Saint Martin two days later.

Coaching career
Between August 2013 and June 2014, Arrieta worked as a trainer for Massapequa Soccer Club in New York. In the following season, he was the head coach of LIAC New York's U19s and also as a trainer at Oceanside United. In April 2015, Arrietta was added to the coaching staff of ISTEP (Italian Soccer Training Exchange Program).

Personal life
Arrieta was the winner of the Italian football reality show Campioni, il Sogno, after which he was granted a trial with Serie A side Internazionale.

International goals
Scores and results list Puerto Rico's goal tally first.

Honors

Club
Puerto Rico Islanders
 USL First Division Championship runners-up: 2008
 Commissioner's Cup: 2008
 CFU Club Championship runner-up: 2009

Individual
 USL First Division MVP: 2009
 USL First Division Defender of the Year: 2008, 2009

References

External links
Puerto Rico Islanders bio
Lecce bio

1979 births
Living people
American soccer players
Puerto Rican footballers
Italian footballers
People of Campanian descent
American people of Italian descent
American people of Basque descent
Puerto Rican people of Basque descent
Puerto Rican people of Spanish descent
Puerto Rican people of Italian descent
Puerto Rico international footballers
USL First Division players
Puerto Rico Islanders players
Philadelphia Union players
A.S.D. Calcio Ivrea players
Calcio Lecco 1912 players
U.S. Lecce players
Fort Lauderdale Strikers players
Serie B players
Major League Soccer players
North American Soccer League players
F.A. Euro players
USL League Two players
Soccer players from Orlando, Florida
Association football defenders